The red-bellied black snake (Pseudechis porphyriacus) is a species of venomous snake in the family Elapidae, indigenous to Australia. Originally described by George Shaw in 1794 as a species new to science, it is one of eastern Australia's most commonly encountered snakes. It is not aggressive and generally retreats from human encounters, but can attack if provoked. Although its venom can cause significant illness, no deaths have been recorded from its bite, which is less venomous than other Australian elapid snakes. The venom contains neurotoxins, myotoxins, and coagulants and has haemolytic properties. Victims can also lose their sense of smell.

Common in woodlands, forests, swamplands, along river banks and waterways the red-bellied black snake often ventures into nearby urban areas. It forages in bodies of shallow water, commonly with tangles of water plants and logs, where it hunts its main prey item, frogs, as well as fish, reptiles, and small mammals. The snake is a least-concern species according to the IUCN, but its numbers are thought to be declining due to habitat fragmentation and decline of frog populations.

Taxonomy
The red-bellied black snake was first described and named by English naturalist George Shaw in Zoology of New Holland (1794) as Coluber porphyriacus.  Incorrectly assuming it was harmless and not venomous, he wrote, "This beautiful snake, which appears to be unprovided with tubular teeth or fangs, and consequently not of a venomous nature, is three, sometimes four, feet in nature." The species name is derived from the Greek porphyrous, which can mean "dark purple", "red-purple" or "beauteous". It was the first Australian elapid snake described. The syntype is presumed lost. French naturalist Bernard Germain de Lacépède described it under the name Trimeresurus leptocephalus in 1804. His countryman René Lesson described it as Acanthophis tortor in 1826. German biologist Hermann Schlegel felt it was allied with cobras and called it Naja porphyrica in 1837.

The genus Pseudechis was created for this species by German biologist Johann Georg Wagler in 1830; several more species have been added to the genus subsequently. The name is derived from the Greek words pseudēs "false", and echis "viper". Snake expert Eric Worrell, in 1961, analysed the skulls of the genus and found that of the red-bellied black snake to be the most divergent. Its position as an early offshoot from the rest of the genus has been confirmed genetically in 2017.

Snake handler Raymond Hoser described two extra subspecies in 2003: P. p. eipperi from the Atherton Tableland and surrounds in north-east Queensland, which he noted was smaller, rarely attaining 2 m (7 ft) and had a white or pale pink rather than red belly, and P. p.  rentoni from southeastern South Australia, which has a variably coloured (often orange or even blueish-tinged) belly. He added that both were disjunct from the main red-bellied black snake population, and as the distinguishing traits of P. p. rentoni were not consistent, then location was the most reliable way of identifying it. These subspecies have not been recognized by other authors, and Hoser has been strongly criticized for identifying some taxa on location alone, and omitting, misinterpreting or inventing evidence of distinctness.

In addition to red-bellied black snake, the species has been called common black snake, redbelly,  and RBBS.  It was known as djirrabidi to the Eora and Darug inhabitants of the Sydney basin.

Description
The red-bellied black snake has a glossy black top body with a light-grey snout and brown mouth, and a completely black tail. It lacks a well-defined neck; its head merges seamlessly into the body. Its flanks are bright red or orange, fading to pink or dull red on the belly. All these scales have black margins. Snakes from northern populations tend to have lighter, more cream or pink bellies. Males are generally slightly larger than females. The red-bellied black snake can have a strong smell, which some field experts have used to find the snakes in the wild.

Like all elapid snakes, it is proteroglyphous (front-fanged). Juveniles are similar to the eastern small-eyed snake (Cryptophis nigrescens), with which they can be easily confused, although the latter species lacks the red flanks. Other similar species include the blue-bellied black snake (Pseudechis guttatus) and copperheads of the genus Austrelaps. An early misconception was that the red-bellied black snake was sexually dimorphic, and that the eastern brown snake (Pseudonaja textilis) was the female form. This error was recognised as such by Australian zoologist Gerard Krefft in his 1869 work Snakes of Australia.

Scalation

The number and arrangement of scales on a snake's body are a key element of identification to species level. The red-bellied black snake has 17 rows of dorsal scales at midbody, 180 to 215 ventral scales, 48 to 60 subcaudal scales (the anterior—and sometimes all—subcaudals are undivided), and a divided anal scale. There are two anterior and two posterior temporal scales, and the rostral shield is roughly square-shaped.

Distribution and habitat

The red-bellied black snake is native to the east coast of Australia, where it is one of the most commonly encountered snakes. It can be found in the urban forest, woodland, plains, and bushland areas of the Blue Mountains, Canberra, Sydney, Brisbane, Melbourne, Cairns, and Adelaide. The Macquarie Marshes mark a western border to its distribution in New South Wales, and Gladstone in central Queensland marks the northern limit to the main population. To the south, it occurs across eastern and central Victoria, and extends along the Murray River into South Australia. Disjunct populations occur in the southern Mount Lofty Ranges in South Australia and in North Queensland.

including into nearby backyards. In particular, the red-bellied black snake prefers areas of shallow water with tangles of water plants, logs, or debris.

Behaviour
Red-bellied black snakes can hide in many places in their habitat, including logs, old mammal burrows, and grass tussocks. They can flee into water and hide there; one was reported as staying submerged for 23 minutes. When swimming, they may hold their full head or the nostrils above the water's surface. At times, they may float without moving on the water surface, thus looking like a stick. Within their habitat, red-bellied black snakes appear to have ranges or territories with which they are familiar and generally remain within. Within their territory, they may have some preferred places to reside.

The red-bellied black snake is generally not an aggressive species, typically withdrawing when approached. If provoked, it recoils into a striking stance as a threat, holding its head and front part of its body horizontally above the ground and widening and flattening its neck. It may bite as a last resort. It is generally active by day, though nighttime activity has occasionally been recorded. When not hunting or basking, it may be found beneath timber, rocks, and rubbish or down holes and burrows.

They also thermoregulate by basking in warm, sunny spots in the cool, early morning and rest in shade in the middle of hot days, and may reduce their activity in hot, dry weather in late summer and autumn. Rather than entering true hibernation, red-bellied black snakes become relatively inactive over winter, retreating to cover and at times emerging on warm, sunny days. Their dark colour allows them to absorb heat from sunshine more quickly. In July 1949, six large individuals were found hibernating under a concrete slab in marshland in Woy Woy, New South Wales. Groups of up to six hibernating red-bellied black snakes have been recorded from under concrete slabs around Mount Druitt and Rooty Hill in western Sydney. Males are more active in the Southern Hemisphere spring (early October to November) as they roam looking for mates; one reportedly travelled  in a day. In summer, both sexes are less active generally.

Reproduction
In spring, male red-bellied black snakes often engage in ritualised combat for 2 to 30 minutes, even attacking other males already mating with females. They wrestle vigorously, but rarely bite, and engage in head-pushing contests, where each snake tries to push his opponent's head downward with his chin.

The male seeks out a female and rubs his chin on her body, and may twitch, hiss, and rarely bite as he becomes aroused. The female indicates readiness to mate by straightening out and allowing their bodies to align. Pregnancy takes place any time from early spring to late summer. Females become much less active and band together in small groups in late pregnancy. They share the same retreat and bask in the sun together. The red-bellied black snake is ovoviviparous; that is, it gives birth to live young in individual membranous sacs, after 14 weeks' gestation, usually in February or March. Females can breed at around 31 months of age, while males can slightly earlier. Red-bellied black snakes can live up to 25 years.

Feeding

The diet of red-bellied black snakes primarily consists of frogs, but they also prey on reptiles and small mammals. They also eat other snakes, commonly eastern brown snakes and even their own species. Fish are hunted in water. Red-bellied black snakes may hunt on or under the water surface, and prey can be eaten underwater or brought to the surface. They have been recorded stirring up substrate, possibly to disturb prey. As red-bellied black snakes grow and mature, they continue to eat the same size prey, but add larger animals, as well. Although they prefer live food, red-bellied black snakes have been reported eating frogs squashed by cars.

They are susceptible to cane toad (Rhinella marina) toxins. The introduction of cane toads in Australia dates to 1935, when they were introduced in an attempt at biological control of native beetles, which were damaging sugarcane fields (a non-native plant). The intervention failed, mostly because the toads are on the ground, while the beetles feed on leaves at the top of the plant. One research study concluded that in less than 75 years, the red-bellied black snake had evolved in toad-inhabited regions of Australia to have increased resistance to toad toxin and decreased preference for toads as prey.

Venom
Early settlers feared the red-bellied black snake, though it turned out to be much less dangerous than many other species. The murine median lethal dose (LD50) is 2.52 mg/kg when administered subcutaneously. A red-bellied black snake yields an average of 37 mg of venom when milked, with the maximum recorded being 94 mg. It accounted for 16% of identified snakebite victims in Australia between 2005 and 2015, with no deaths recorded. Its venom contains neurotoxins, myotoxins, and coagulants and also has haemolytic properties.

Bites from red-bellied black snakes can be very painful—needing analgesia—and result in local swelling, prolonged bleeding, and even local necrosis, particularly if the bite is on a finger. Severe local reactions may require surgical debridement or even amputation. Symptoms of systemic envenomation—including nausea, vomiting, headache, abdominal pain, diarrhoea, or excessive sweating—were thought to be rare, but a 2010 review found they occurred in most bite victims. Most people also go on to develop an anticoagulant coagulopathy in a few hours. This is characterised by a raised activated partial thromboplastin time (aPTT), and subsides over 24 hours. It resolves quickly with antivenom. A few people go on to develop a myotoxicity and associated generalised muscle pain and occasionally weakness, which may last up to 7 days. Patients may suffer a loss of sense of smell (anosmia); this is unrelated to the severity of the envenoming and can be temporary or permanent. Although the venom contains the three-finger toxin α-elapitoxin-Ppr1, which acts as a neurotoxin in laboratory experiments, neurotoxic symptoms are generally absent in clinical cases.

A biologically active agent—pseudexin—was isolated from red-bellied black snake venom in 1981. Making up 25% of the venom, it is a single polypeptide chain with a molecular weight around 16.5 kilodaltons. In 1989, it was found to be composed of three phospholipase A2 isoenzymes. If antivenom is indicated, red-bellied black snake bites are generally treated with tiger snake antivenom. While black snake antivenom can be used, tiger snake antivenom can be used at a lower volume and is a cheaper treatment.

It is the most commonly reported species responsible for envenomed dogs in New South Wales. In 2006, a 12-year-old golden retriever suffered rhabdomyolysis and acute kidney injury secondary to a red-bellied black snake bite. Laboratory testing has found that cats are relatively resistant to the venom, with a lethal dose as high as 7 mg/kg.

Conservation and threats
The red-bellied black snake is considered to be a least-concern species according to the International Union for Conservation of Nature. Its preferred habitat has been particularly vulnerable to urban development and is highly fragmented, and a widespread decline in frogs, which are its preferred prey, has occurred. Snake numbers appear to have declined. Feral cats are known to prey on red-bellied black snakes, while young snakes presumably are taken by laughing kookaburras (Dacelo novaeguineae), brown falcons (Falco berigora), and other raptors.

Captivity
One of the snakes commonly kept as pets in Australia, the red-bellied black snake adapts readily to captivity and lives on a supply of mice, though it can also survive on fish fillets, chicken, and dog food.

Notes

References

Citations

Cited books

External links
 
 
 Pictures of the red-bellied black snake's fangs

Pseudechis
Endemic fauna of Australia
Snakes of Australia
Reptiles of New South Wales
Reptiles of Queensland
Reptiles of South Australia
Reptiles of Victoria (Australia)
Reptiles described in 1794
Taxa named by George Shaw